Khan Bahadur Kavasji Jamshedji Petigara  (24 November 1877 – 28 March 1941) was the first Indian to become the Deputy Commissioner of Police of the Mumbai Police in 1928. He was in charge of the Crime Branch division and was noted for his intelligence network. A decorated officer, he was appointed an Officer of the Order of the British Empire (OBE), Companion of the Indian Empire (CIE) and awarded the King's Police Medal (KPM). Petigara was also awarded the Imperial Service Order (ISO) and used the honorific title "Khan Bahadur". He joined the police force as a sub-inspector at the CID (Criminal Investigations Department), and gradually rose through the ranks. In 1928, he was promoted to the Indian Police Service rank, one that very few Indians achieved in those days.

Among his accomplishments was his role in foiling an attempt by Indian freedom activist Manabendra Nath Roy in toppling the government. Despite being a staunch loyalist of the British Indian government, he was respected by Indian freedom fighters. When Mahatma Gandhi applied for a passport in 1931 to attend the second Round Table Conference in London, Petigara was cited as one of his references. He retired from the police force in 1936.

On 1940-06-08 a statue of him was erected for the "valuable services rendered to the city". The statue is located near Metro Adlabs in South Mumbai. He died on 28 March 1941.

Personal life
Petigara was born on 24 November 1877 to Jamshedji Nusserwanji Petigara and Dhunbhaiji Bastavalla. He did his schooling in Surat in Gujarat, and later Bombay (now Mumbai). He was married to Avambai, the daughter of Jehangirshaw Ardeshir Taleyarkhan. They had one son. He was also the estate manager of Prince Aly Khan at Aga Khan building in Dalal Street in Mumbai. He died on 28 March 1941 after undergoing an operation.

Decorations

References

External links
  Photo of his felicitation
 Figureheads

1877 births
1941 deaths
Indian civil servants
Indian Companions of the Imperial Service Order
Companions of the Order of the Indian Empire
Indian Officers of the Order of the British Empire
Colonial recipients of the Queen's Police Medal
Police Commissioners of Mumbai
Parsi people from Mumbai
People from Surat
Parsi people
Indian justices of the peace
Indian police officers
Politicians from Mumbai
Recipients of the Kaisar-i-Hind Medal
Police officers in British India